Manuel Semprún y Pombo (11 September 1868 – 30 November 1929) was a Spanish lawyer. He served as Mayor of Valladolid (1906–1907) and Madrid (1927).

References 

19th-century Spanish lawyers
Mayors of Madrid
Mayors of Valladolid
1929 deaths
1868 births
Civil governors of Madrid
20th-century Spanish lawyers